Najee's Theme is the debut album by American jazz saxophonist and flautist, Najee. This album earned Najee a Grammy Award Nomination for Best R&B Instrumental Performance in 1988.

Critical reception

Peggy Oliver of The Urban Music Scene writes, "It is hard to fathom that thirty years have passed since the single “Najee’s Theme” and the supporting album blazed the R&B and jazz charts, which for a debut recording was a remarkable accomplishment in itself." She gave the album 4½ out of five stars.

The New Pittsburgh Courier did a piece on Najee and remarked about the album, "Najee became a top name in instrumental and jazz music circles after releasing, “Najee’s Theme” in 1986."

Charts
Top Contemporary Jazz Albums No. 1
Top Jazz Albums No. 8
Top R&B/Hip-Hop Albums No. 12
The Billboard 200 No. 56

Track listing

All track information and credits were taken from the CD liner notes.

References

External links
Najee Official Site
EMI Records Official Site

1986 debut albums
Najee albums
EMI America Records albums